Paweł Rakoczy (born 15 May 1987 in Złotoryja) is a Polish javelin thrower. He competed in 2012 European Athletics Championships and in the javelin throw at the 2012 Summer Olympics and placed 28th with a mark of 77.36 metres. In 2008 he was warned after testing positive for Sibutramine.

Personal best: 84.99 (2012).

Seasonal bests by year
2005 - 68.84
2006 - 72.36
2008 - 77.71
2009 - 79.73
2010 - 78.13
2011 - 82.53
2012 - 84.99
2013 - 74.88
2014 - 74.29

References

1987 births
Living people
Polish male javelin throwers
Olympic athletes of Poland
Athletes (track and field) at the 2012 Summer Olympics
People from Złotoryja
Sportspeople from Lower Silesian Voivodeship